Jonathan Perry may refer to:

 Jonathan Perry (footballer) (born 1976), New Zealand association football player
 Jonathan Perry (cricketer) (born 1965), former English cricketer 
 Jonathan Perry (politician) (born 1973), Republican member of the Louisiana State Senate 
 J. Perry (born 1988), Jonathan Perry, Haitian singer, songwriter, and composer